The Brownsville–Harlingen Metropolitan Statistical Area, as defined by the United States Census Bureau, is an area consisting of one county–Cameron–in the Rio Grande Valley region of South Texas, anchored by the cities of Brownsville and Harlingen. The 2012 U.S. Census Bureau estimate places its metropolitan area population at 415,557, ranking as the eighth most populous metropolitan area in the state of Texas. It is also a component of the Brownsville–Harlingen–Raymondville combined statistical area, which covers two counties (Cameron and Willacy) and had an estimated population of 416,766 as of July 1, 2009.

Brownsville is frequently cited as having one of the highest poverty rates in the United States, with more than 35% of area residents living under the federal poverty line. The typical Brownsville-Harlingen, Texas household earns $32,093 a year, or $21,564 less than the typical American household. 64.6% of Brownsville area adults have at least a high school diploma, 22.3 percentage points fewer than the national average. About 29% of area households rely on food stamps, the third highest percentage of any metro area in the country.

Counties
Cameron

Communities

Incorporated places
Town of Bayview
City of Brownsville (Principal city)
Town of Combes
City of Harlingen (Principal city)
Town of Indian Lake
Town of Laguna Vista
City of Los Fresnos
Town of Los Indios
City of Palm Valley
City of Port Isabel
Town of Primera
Town of Rancho Viejo
Village of Rangerville
City of Rio Hondo
City of San Benito
Town of Santa Rosa
Town of South Padre Island

Census-designated places (unincorporated)

See also
Texas census statistical areas

References

Metropolitan areas of Texas
Brownsville, Texas
Geography of Cameron County, Texas